The Hong Kong Football Association Limited, often abbreviated to the HKFA, is the governing body of association football in Hong Kong. Its current chairman is Pui Kwan Kay and its Chief Executive Officer is Joaquin Tam.

History 
The HKFA was established in 1914. It is one of the oldest Football Federations in Asia and is responsible for organising various football competitions including professional and amateur leagues,  football development and promoting football in Hong Kong.

In 1954, HKFA joined FIFA, and was also one of twelve founding associations of the Asian Football Confederation. Hong Kong played an important role in the early development of Asian football, and was given the honour of hosting the first Asian Cup competition in 1956, in which Hong Kong came third in the tournament.

Having been a part of the British Empire, and, more recently part of the People's Republic of China, Hong Kong fields a separate FIFA-recognised representative team.

HKFA is also responsible for operating the Hong Kong national football team, which represents Hong Kong and competes in international football events.

HKFA's president is Timothy Fok SBS JP. The association is currently led by chairman Brian Leung Hung-tak.

Project Phoenix 
Project Phoenix is a government-supported project. It is a strategy and action plan  to reform Hong  Kong football from top to bottom.

2010–11 
Former The FA executive director David Davies led the team of change agent - Scott Wilson Group, which was appointed by Hong Kong Football Association in September 2010 to carry out the reform and restructuring of football in Hong Kong.

On 21 November 2011, HKFA named Gordon McKie as its first Chief Executive Officer (CEO).  Gordon, the former Chairman of the Scottish Rugby Union, had served HKFA for only ten months and resign from his post in September 2012 with personal reasons.

On 17 December 2011, HKFA appointed Ernie Merrick as the National Head Coach of Hong Kong Football Team. Merrick told to media that he felt honor to have an opportunity to participate the development and growing of Hong Kong football. Merrick won two titles in six season for Melbourne Victory. He started his new role on 9 January 2012.

On 23 December 2011, Kim Pan-Gon named National Academy Coach. Coach Kim will be wholly responsible for the identification, development and coaching of all players aged 18 and below.

2012–13 
On 17 April 2012, Australian Steve O'Connor was appointed as the new technical director. The former head coach of the football program at the Australian Institute of Sport will take up his new post in will be responsible to improve the standards of local coaching, referee development, community and youth football activities and women's football. He will also oversee the implementation of elite player development pathways from grassroots football to senior international level.

On 17 September 2012, HKFA appointed Mark Sutcliffe to replace Gordon Mckie as the CEO of HKFA.

On 7 February 2013, the Hong Kong Football Association stated that the new Premier League would get under way in Autumn 2014, where it was suggested that the 2013–14 season would be a transition year.

On 28 May 2013, HKFA promoted Korean coach Kim Pan-Gon to replace Ernie Merrick as the head coach of Hong Kong national team.

2015 
In June 2015, The Government turned green light to build a national training centre in Tseung Kwan O. The budget of construction will be fully supported by the Hong Kong Jockey Club.

On 29 November 2015, Asian Football Confederation awarded the AFC Developing Member Association of the Year award to Hong Kong Football Association  in recognition of its professional administration and governance as well its exceptional contribution to the development and promotion of the game at all levels within the country.

2019 
On 4 December 2019, Asian Football Confederation awarded the ÁFC Developing Member Association of the Year award to Hong Kong Football Association in recognition of excellent work in football development, women and girls football, community and district football, referee development, sports science, charitable projects and the expansion of facilities with the opening on the long-awaited Football Training Centre.

Criticism 
Timothy Fok has served as president of the Hong Kong Football Association since 1997, after his father held the position for almost 30 years. In July 2020, the Legislative Council's Public Accounts Committee criticized the HKFA under Timothy Fok, stating its governance was "appalling and inexcusable". It noted that an internal audit committee, designed to review the association's use of taxpayer funding, was not active between 2015 and 2019, despite receiving HK$34 million in funding for the 2017-18 year. Members of the Legislative Council also questioned if that taxpayer money was justified and well spent. After HKFA's governance was criticized, the Legislative Council wanted to appoint board members to improve HKFA's governance, but the HKFA rejected the idea and claimed candidates should go through proper election procedures.

In 2020, the government's Audit Commission criticized HKFA, stating that the government had given HK$160,000,000 of taxpayer money to the HKFA but there was little improvement, and that Project Phoenix had a "lack of progress". The report stated that some performance metrics had even declined since 2009, rather than improving.

In August 2022, a former coach of the women's team was arrested for alleged sexual harassment of two female players. The association received a report from one of the victims but declined to intervene as the coach was no longer a staff member, stating "We feel there is no authority to intervene in the case after careful consideration since the case did not involve the association's current staff or took place at an association-sponsored event."

Renaming 
After the handover of Hong Kong in 1997, the HKFA has used the founding name - the "Hong Kong Football Association" until now.

In early 2023, the HKFA and other Hong Kong national sports associations were required by the "Sports Federation and Olympic Committee of Hong Kong, China" to add "China" to the name of the association.The HKFA eventually adopted the change of name of association to "The Football Association of Hong Kong, China" during the annual meeting of the HKFA in March 2023.

Funding 
In terms of government funding, the HKFA has been one of the top receivers of taxpayer money out of all National Sports Associations in Hong Kong. Excluding one-time grants, it receives money from the Sports Subvention Scheme (SSS) and the Arts and Sport Development Fund (ASDF).

Staff

Chairman

Chief Executive Officer

See also 
 Hong Kong national football team
 Hong Kong Premier League
 Hong Kong Senior Challenge Shield
 Hong Kong FA Cup
 Hong Kong League Cup

References

External links
 Official Site
 Hong Kong at FIFA site
  Hong Kong at AFC site

Football in Hong Kong
Asian Football Confederation member associations
Football
Sports organizations established in 1914
1914 establishments in Hong Kong